The 10th Delta Operations Squadron (10 DOS) is a United States Space Force unit assigned to Space Training and Readiness Command's Space Delta 10. It provides  operations support to the delta. Temporarily headquartered at the United States Air Force Academy, Colorado, it was activated on 30 September 2021 following a ceremonial activation of Space Delta 10.

List of commanders 
 Lt Col Jonisa McGlown, 30 September 2021

See also 
 Space Delta 10

References

External links 
 

Military education and training in the United States
Squadrons of the United States Space Force
Military units and formations in Colorado
Military units and formations established in 2021
2021 establishments in Colorado